was a  after Ryakunin and before Ninji. This period spanned the years from February 1239 to July 1240.

Change of era
 1239 :  The era name was changed to mark an event or a number of events. The previous era ended and a new one commenced in Ryakunin 2.

Events of the En'ō Era
 1239 (En'ō 1, 1st month): The Daijo daijin  retired from worldly concerns, taking the tonsure of a Buddhist priest.
 1239 (En'ō 1, 2nd month): Former Emperor Go-Toba died at age 60.

Notes

References
 Nussbaum, Louis-Frédéric and Käthe Roth. (2005).  Japan encyclopedia. Cambridge: Harvard University Press. ;  OCLC 58053128
 Titsingh, Isaac. (1834). Nihon Odai Ichiran; ou,  Annales des empereurs du Japon.  Paris: Royal Asiatic Society, Oriental Translation Fund of Great Britain and Ireland. OCLC 5850691
 Varley, H. Paul. (1980). A Chronicle of Gods and Sovereigns: Jinnō Shōtōki of Kitabatake Chikafusa. New York: Columbia University Press. ;  OCLC 6042764

External links
 National Diet Library, "The Japanese Calendar" -- historical overview plus illustrative images from library's collection

Japanese eras
1230s in Japan
1240s in Japan